The FPS Economy, SMEs, Middle Classes, and Energy, more commonly known as the FPS Economy, is a Federal Public Service of Belgium. It was created by Royal Order on 25 February 2002, as part of the plans of the Verhofstadt I Government to modernise the federal administration. It is responsible for contributing to the development, competitiveness and sustainability of the goods and services market, ensuring the position of the Belgian economy at the international level, promoting trade by fair economic relations in a competitive market, collecting, processing and disseminating economic information.

Organisation
The FPS Economy is currently organised into seven Directorates-General:
 The Directorate-General for Energy
 The Directorate-General for Economic Regulation
 The Directorate-General for Economic Analysis and International Economy
 The Directorate-General for SMEs Policy
 The Directorate-General for Quality and Security
 The Directorate-General for Economic Inspection
 The Directorate-General for Statistics, also known as Statistics Belgium

See also
 Economy of Belgium

External links
 Website of the FPS Economy Belgium

Economy
Belgium
Belgium, Economy
2002 establishments in Belgium